The Jenkins Heights are a broad ice-covered area rising over  and covering some , located south of McClinton Glacier and west of Mount Bray on the Bakutis Coast of Marie Byrd Land, Antarctica. They were mapped by the United States Geological Survey from surveys and U.S. Navy aerial photographs, 1959–66, and were named by the Advisory Committee on Antarctic Names after Charles Jenkins, a geophysicist with the National Oceanic and Atmospheric Administration, and Station Scientific Leader at South Pole Station in the winter party of 1974.

References

Ice slopes of Antarctica
Bodies of ice of Marie Byrd Land